This is an incomplete list, which will never be able to satisfy particular standards for completeness as it excludes bootlegs, mix tapes and other minor records by independent labels and unofficial sources.

Miles Davis was an American trumpeter, bandleader and musical composer. His major (without bootlegs, etc.) discography consists of at least 61 studio albums, 39 live albums, 46 compilation albums, 27 box sets, 4 soundtrack albums, 57 singles and 3 remix albums.

Davis' initial appearances on record were mainly as a member of bebop saxophonist Charlie Parker's quintet from 1944 through 1947 and released on the Savoy label. Davis made his debut as a leader in the 1946 sessions featuring Parker, pianist John Lewis, bassist Nelson Boyd and drummer Max Roach. Prestige Records released Davis' debut album, The New Sounds, in 1951. He recorded many studio albums under the Prestige label from 1951 through 1956, as well as Blue Moods, issued by Debut Records in 1955, and three sessions for Blue Note Records. The earliest Davis music released was recorded from April 4, 1945 through August 14, 1947, and reissued in CD format by Savoy Records under the title First Miles.
From 1949 through 1950, Davis recorded twelve tunes with a nonet consisting of other noted jazz musicians including arranger Gil Evans, Gerry Mulligan, Lee Konitz, John Lewis, Max Roach and Kenny Clarke. The arrangements for that group were scored for instruments rarely used in jazz such as French horn and tuba. These recordings, which were labeled cool jazz and eventually appeared on the album Birth of the Cool in 1957 by Capitol Records, marked an important influence on the future of jazz. He later signed to Columbia and released 'Round About Midnight on March 18, 1957. His acclaimed 1959 album Kind of Blue is generally stated to be the best-selling jazz album of all time, although the data are not conclusive. The follow-up album in 1960, Sketches of Spain, went gold.

He formed his Second Great Quintet in 1964. With the release of Miles in the Sky, Davis permanently abandoned hard bop, instead adopting jazz fusion and avant-garde jazz. In this era he released the studio album Bitches Brew, which was certified platinum, culminating in the long electric jams from the mid-1970s released as Pangaea, Agharta, and Dark Magus. After a six-year retirement, Davis released albums under the Columbia and Warner Bros. labels during the period between 1981 and 1991. These recordings combined jazz with popular music genres as he turned more toward the mainstream. He finished his music career with Doo-Bop, in which he experimentally combined jazz with hip-hop, his discography ultimately being extensively sampled in hip-hop, such as with beats from his 1972 album On the Corner.

Studio albums

Prestige/Blue Note/Debut, 1951–1961

Columbia, 1955–1976 

A  the September 30, 2008 re-release Kind of Blue – 50th Anniversary Collection reached number 92 in the Belgian albums chart in 2009.
B  1987 reissue

Columbia/Warner Bros., 1981–1991

Live albums

Compilations and remixes

Soundtracks

Box sets

Compilation box sets

Limited edition box set

Live box sets

The Bootleg Series box sets

Singles

Albums recorded as sideman

Videography

Video albums

References

External links

Japanese chart history at Oricon
Miles Davis collector site 
"Miles Davis Collector's Guides & Discographies"
Miles Davis at Music Box
78rpm vinyl records collection
 

Jazz discographies
Discography
Discographies of American artists